The 1993 CONCACAF Gold Cup Final was an association football match that took place on 25 July 1993 at the Estadio Azteca in Mexico City, Mexico, to determine the winner of the 1993 CONCACAF Gold Cup. This was the second final in the history of CONCACAF Gold Cup and second consecutive final for the United States after they beat Honduras in a penalty shootout in the 1991 final. They faced Mexico, who were making their first appearance in a Gold Cup Final. El Tri won the match 4–0 in front of 120,000 spectators.

As the Gold Cup champion, Mexico qualified as the CONCACAF representative in the 1995 King Fahd Cup in Saudi Arabia.

Background 
Prior to the match, Mexico were favorites to win it all after Zague had scored 10 goals in every match in the competition they had played except their 1–1 draw with Costa Rica. On the contrary, the United States had won all of their games by 1 goal, and scored a golden goal against Costa Rica in the semi-finals.

Route to the final

Match

Details

References

External links 
 Official website 

CONCACAF Gold Cup finals
Final
CONCACAF Gold Cup Final
CONCACAF Gold Cup Final
CONCACAF Gold Cup Final
United States men's national soccer team matches
Mexico national football team matches
Mexico–United States soccer rivalry
Football in Mexico City
Sports competitions in Mexico City
Tlalpan
CONCACAF Gold Cup Final